Pearl City is an incorporated village in Stephenson County, Illinois, with a population of 838 at the 2010 census, up from 780 in 2000.

Demographics

As of the census of 2000, there were 780 people, 293 households, and 225 families residing in the village. The racial makeup of the village was 98.21% White, 0.38% African American, 0.13% Asian, 0.26% from other races, and 0.38% from two or more races. Hispanic or Latino of any race were 0.64% of the population.

There were 293 households, out of which 44.0% had children under the age of 18 living with them, 63.5% were married couples living together, 9.6% had a female householder with no husband present, and 23.2% were non-families. 20.1% of all households were made up of individuals, and 12.6% had someone living alone who was 65 years of age or older. The average household size was 2.66 and the average family size was 3.04.

In the village, the population was spread out, with 29.9% under the age of 18, 7.2% from 18 to 24, 29.9% from 25 to 44, 20.3% from 45 to 64, and 12.8% who were 65 years of age or older. The median age was 33 years. For every 100 females, there were 91.2 males. For every 100 females age 18 and over, there were 86.7 males. Population of 803 in 2011.

The median income for a household in the village was $43,929, and the median income for a family was $55,096. Males had a median income of $35,313 versus $24,141 for females. The per capita income for the village was $19,256. About 4.1% of families and 4.6% of the population were below the poverty line, including 2.5% of those under age 18 and 18.6% of those age 65 or over.

Geography
Pearl City is located at  (42.266179, -89.827185). It is a part of the Freeport Micropolitan Statistical Area, which includes all of Stephenson County.

 The village is situated on Illinois Route 73, which runs south to Lanark and north to the Wisconsin border through Lena and Winslow.

 Pearl City is located approximately six miles south of U.S. Route 20, which traverses the US from Boston in the east to Newport, Oregon in the west.

Climate

Local organizations
Pearl City is home to three churches, Zion Community, St. John's Lutheran, and Pearl City Methodist. There are two local 4-H clubs, The Pearl City Hornets, and the Pearl Valley Rangers. Civic organizations include Post 1014 of the American Legion and Club 261 of the Lions Club.

Notable people
 Robert E. Brinkmeier (1922-2007) was an American politician, businessman and educator
 Forrest Iandola is an American computer scientist and entrepreneur

References

External links
City-data
 Village of Pearl City webpage
 Pearl City School District
 Pearl City Park District

Villages in Stephenson County, Illinois
Villages in Illinois
Populated places established in 1892